The 1996 Primera B de Chile was the 45th completed season of the Primera B de Chile.

Deportes La Serena (tournament’s champion) alongside Deportes Puerto Montt were promoted to 1997 Primera División de Chile season after finishing in the first and second places respectively.

League table

Promotion/relegation play-offs

Top scorers

References

External links
 RSSSF 1996

Primera B de Chile seasons
Primera B
Chil